Harrington's gerbil or Harrington's tateril (Taterillus harringtoni) is a species of rodent found in the Central African Republic, Ethiopia, Kenya, Somalia, South Sudan, Tanzania, and Uganda. Its natural habitats are dry savanna, subtropical or tropical dry shrubland, and subtropical or tropical dry lowland grassland. It is sometimes considered to be conspecific with Emin's gerbil, because it has the same karyotype.

References

Musser, G. G. and M. D. Carleton. 2005. Superfamily Muroidea. pp. 894–1531 in Mammal Species of the World a Taxonomic and Geographic Reference. D. E. Wilson and D. M. Reeder eds. Johns Hopkins University Press, Baltimore.

Taterillus
Mammals described in 1906
Taxa named by Oldfield Thomas
Rodents of Africa
Taxonomy articles created by Polbot
Taxobox binomials not recognized by IUCN